Patrick Frank Friesen (born 5 July 1946) is a Canadian author born in Steinbach, Manitoba, primarily known for his poetry and stage plays beginning in the 1970s.

Life and career

Friesen was born into a Mennonite family in Steinbach, Manitoba in 1946. As a child growing in Steinbach, he was friends with Shingoose, who later became a well-known musician. After high school, he studied at the University of Manitoba and lived in Winnipeg for thirty years.

In addition to poetry, Friesen has also written songs and collaborated with dancers, choreographers, composers and musicians. His Mennonite upbringing still influences his writing in work such as "The Shunning", which is about the persecution of a Mennonite farmer questioning his religion. Friesen won the McNally Robinson Book of the Year Award at the Manitoba Book Awards for his work on "Blasphemer's Wheel," and was runner up in Milton Acorn's People's Poetry Awards. In 1997, his work, "A Broken Bowl", was short listed for the Governor General's Award for English-language poetry.

Friesen collaborated with Per Brask on the translation from Danish of Ulrikka S. Gernes' Frayed Opus for Strings & Wind Instruments, which has been shortlisted for the 2016 Griffin Poetry Prize.
Friesen lives in Victoria, British Columbia, and is a teacher of creative writing at the University of Victoria. He is married to poet Eve Joseph.

Bibliography
The Lands I Am – 1976
Bluebottle – 1978
The Shunning – 1980
Unearthly Horses – 1985
Flicker and Hawk – 1987
You Don't Get to Be a Saint – 1992
Blasphemer's Wheel: Selected and New Poems – 1994
A Broken Bowl – 1997 (nominated for a Governor General's Award)
St. Mary at Main – 1998
Carrying the Shadow – 1999 (nominated for the Dorothy Livesay Poetry Prize)
The Breath You Take from the Lord – 2002 (nominated for the Dorothy Livesay Poetry Prize)\
Bordello Poems – 2004
Interim: Essays and Mediations –  2005
Earth's Crude Gravities – 2007
jumping in the asylum – 2011
a dark boat – 2012
a short history of crazy bone – 2015
songen – 2018
Outlasting the Weather: Selected and New Poems – 2020

Audio
Blue Door – 1997 (with Marilyn Lerner)
Small Rooms – 2003 (with Marilyn Lerner)
Calling the Dog Home – 2005 (with Marilyn Lerner)

Anthologies
An Anthology of Prairie Poetry – 1981 (Draft)
Ride Off Any Horizon – 1983
Visions and Reality – 1985
Pieces of the Jigsaw: A Multicultural Anthology for Young Readers – 1986Why I am a Mennonite – 1988Section Lines: A Manitoba Anthology – 1986A Labour of Love – 1989A/long Prairie Lines: An Anthology of Long Prairie Poems – 1989Liars and Rascals, anthology of Mennonite short stories – 1989Prairie Fire: New Mennonite Writing – 1989Mennonite/s Writing in Canada – 1990The Perfect Piece, Monologues from Canadian Plays – 1990Inscriptions, A Prairie Poetry Anthology – 1992Let the Earth Take Note, First Anthology of the National Milton Acorn Festival from 1987 to 1991 – 1994Poetry and Knowing, essays – 1995Our Fathers, Poetry and Prose, by daughters and sons from the prairies – 1995Instant Applause, Volume II, Thirty Very Short Complete Plays – 1996Passeport: La Poésie Moderne de Langue Anglaise au Canada – 1998Following the Plough: Recovering the Rural – 2000New Life in Dark Seas: Brick Books 25 – 2000Mocambo Nights: Poetry From the Mocambo Reading Series – 2001The New Long Line Anthology, 2nd Edition – 200115 Canadian Poets x 3 – 2001Why I Sing the Blues' – 2001
Instant Applause: Twenty-nine Very Short Complete Plays – 2004

Other works and collaborations
The Shunning, the Play, staged in 1985 by Prairie Theatre Exchange in Winnipeg, in 1992 by Theatre & Co. in Kitchener, in 1992 by Trinity Theatre in Livonia, Michigan, in 1993 by MAUS Theatre in B.C., and in 1995 by Two Planks and a Passion in Nova Scotia.
Amanda, a short drama on CBC Radio Manitoba, 1986.
Anna, a dance/words collaboration with choreographer Stephanie Ballard, with guest artist Margie Gillis, performed in 1987 at the Gas Station Theatre in Winnipeg.
Noah, a multi-disciplinary collaboration, presented as a working piece in 1987 at Main Access Gallery, Winnipeg.
Singer, a docu-drama on Richard Manuel for CBC Radio Manitoba, 1989 (with Big Dave McLean).
The Shunning, a one-hour radio adaptation for CBC Radio Canada, 1990 (producer: John Juliani).
Second Birth, a short drama for CBC Radio Canada, 1991.
Handful of Rain, a multi-disciplinary collaboration with Dance Collective, and various artists, performed at Gas Station Theatre, Winnipeg, April 1991.
The Raft, an original play, performed January 1992 at Prairie Theatre Exchange in Winnipeg, in February 1995 by Theatre & Co. in Kitchener.
The Raft, adapted for CBC Radio Canada, by Nancy Trites Botkin (producer: Kathleen Flaherty), 1997.
Friday, 6:32 p.m., an original short play written for the Short Shots series, staged by the Manitoba Association of Playwrights, 1993.
Old Woman and the Bones, collaboration with composer Michael Matthews, the musical group Thira, and Primus Theatre, staged at the New Music Festival in Winnipeg in February 1993.
Madrugada (a longer version of Old Woman and the Bones), performed by Groundswell and Primus Theatre at the Franco-Manitoban Cultural Centre in Winnipeg, April 1995.
The Shunning, adapted, choreographed and performed by Motus O dance theatre at the Tarragon Theatre, Toronto, 13–17 Sept. 1995.
 Broken Bowl (a segment from A Broken Bowl), created, performed with jazz pianist Marilyn Lerner, Sunstone Coffee, Winnipeg, 17 July 1996, at The Glass Slipper, Vancouver, 3 Oct 1996, four performances at the Atlantic Jazz Festival, Halifax, July 1997, and recorded by CBC Radio Manitoba, and called Blue Door (Producer: Andrea Ratuski), 1996.
 Voice, a radio documentary (featuring Big Dave McLean and Tracey Dahl), by CBC Radio Manitoba (Producer: Andrea Ratuski), 1996.

Film
Esther Warkov: A Spy in the House; producer – 1983.
Don Proch: The Spirit of Assessippi; writer/producer/director – 1985.
Patrick Lane; director/producer – 1985.
A Ritual of Horses: The Art of Michael Olito; director – 1987.
Rising to Dance, a documentary on senior students at the Royal Winnipeg Ballet; director – 1990.
Together As One: A Dance Collaboration; writer/director/producer – 1991.

References

External links

Patrick Friesen fonds (R11734) at Library and Archives Canada

1946 births
Living people
Canadian Mennonites
Mennonite writers
Mennonite poets
20th-century Canadian poets
Canadian male poets
21st-century Canadian poets
20th-century Canadian male writers
21st-century Canadian male writers
Writers from Steinbach, Manitoba